Stanisław Węgrzecki (10 November 1765, Warsaw - 12 February 1845, Warsaw) was the President of Warsaw.

1765 births
1845 deaths
Mayors of Warsaw